Antelope Creek is a tributary of the Sacramento River, located in the Lassen National Forest in Tehama County, California. The creek is home to both spring-run Chinook salmon and steelhead trout.

The name "Antelope Creek" is a faithful translation of the old Spanish name Arroyo de los Berrendos.

References

Rivers of Shasta County, California
Rivers of Tehama County, California
Tributaries of the Sacramento River